John Kirkwood may refer to:

 John Kirkwood (engraver) (died 1853), Scot who became the foremost engraver in Dublin during the 1830s
 John A. Kirkwood (1851–1930), American soldier and Medal of Honor recipient
 John Gamble Kirkwood (1907–1959), American chemist and physicist
 John Hendley Morrison Kirkwood (1877–1924), British landowner and politician